Jatuncocha (possibly from Quechua hatun (in Bolivia always jatun) big, large qucha lake, "big lake") is a lake in the Cordillera Blanca in the Andes of Peru located in the Ancash Region, Huaylas Province, Santa Cruz District. Jatunccocha lies in the Santa Cruz gorge between the peaks of Quitaraju in the north and Caraz in the south, northeast of a smaller lake named Ichiccocha (Quechua for "little lake").

The Santa Cruz Creek flows through the lake. It is a right tributary of the Santa River.

References 

Lakes of Peru
Lakes of Ancash Region